Helsinki Halli (formerly Hartwall Arena) is a large multi-functional indoor arena located in Helsinki, Finland. It was opened in April 1997. The arena is convertible for various events. The total seated capacity during ice hockey games is 13,349 (about 14,000 for basketball, for concerts up to 15,000) and as an amphitheatre, it is significantly reduced to between 3,000 to 5,000.

The Russian-owned arena has been unused since March 2022 due to EU sanctions related to the Russian invasion of Ukraine. The main sponsor, Hartwall, also ended its sponsorship and the arena's name was changed.

Construction and facilities  
The initiative for building the arena came from Harry "Hjallis" Harkimo in 1994. It was built to be ready for the Ice Hockey World Championships in 1997, and was delivered by the constructor on 11 April 1997. The building is elliptical, 153 metres long and 123 metres wide. It also has a practice arena 37 metres underground, used by many hockey teams. It is connected to a multi-storey carpark, which has a total capacity of 1,421 vehicles.

The arena is situated next to Pasila railway station, which is the second busiest railway station in Finland, 3.5 km north of the Helsinki Central railway station.

Other and former names 

The national broadcaster Yle calls the arena "Helsingin areena" or "Helsingforsarenan" ("The Helsinki Arena" in Finnish and Swedish). The newspaper Helsingin Sanomat calls it "Helsinki-areena".

It was branded as "Hartwall Areena" from its opening until 2014, and as "Hartwall Arena" thereafter until 2 March 2022. The beverage company Hartwall, also based in Helsinki, was its largest sponsor, and thus got the naming rights. Hartwall ended its sponsorship in March 2022, to avoid association with the Russian main owners of the arena, Roman Rotenberg and Gennady Timchenko, in the wake of the 2022 Russian invasion of Ukraine.

Events

Entertainment

Sports 

The arena is the home venue of the ice hockey team Jokerit.

The arena has also been used for Ice Hockey World Championships, World Figure Skating Championships, NHL Challenge, and World Cup of Hockey. On October 2nd 2009, the NHL opened its season in the arena with a matchup between the Chicago Blackhawks and the Florida Panthers, making it the first NHL game to be held in Finland. In May 2011, the arena served as the main venue of the 2012 IIHF World Championship. It hosted all Group A games and quarterfinals, all semifinals and the bronze and gold medal games. Group B games and quarterfinals were hosted in Ericsson Globe, Stockholm. It also co-hosted the 2013 IIHF World Championship with Ericsson Globe, but in 2013 all games after quarterfinals were played in Stockholm.

The arena was one of the host venues of the 2016 World Junior Ice Hockey Championships. Its assignment included hosting the gold-medal game, in which Kasperi Kapanen scored an Overtime goal to win Gold for Finland on home ice.

One of the group stages of EuroBasket 2017, was also played at the arena.

The arena hosted two 2018–19 regular season NHL games between the Winnipeg Jets and Florida Panthers on Thursday, 1 November 2018 and Friday, 2 November 2018 as part of the 2018 NHL Global Series.

See also 
 List of indoor arenas in Finland
 List of indoor arenas in Nordic countries
 List of European ice hockey arenas

References

External links 

  

1997 establishments in Finland
Buildings and structures in Helsinki
Indoor arenas in Finland
Indoor ice hockey venues in Finland
Jokerit
Finland
Pasila
Sports venues completed in 1997
Sports venues in Helsinki